"Controlla" is a song by Canadian rapper Drake, recorded for his fourth studio album Views. The song was released as the fourth single from the album in the US on June 7, 2016. The dancehall song was written by Drake, Matthew Samuels, Dwayne Chin-Quee, Stephen McGregor, Moses Davis, Donald Dennis, Gary Jackson, Patrick Roberts, Andrew Thomas, and produced by Boi-1da, Supa Dups, Di Genius, TheFinal1 and Allen Ritter.

It reached number 27 in Canada, number 18 in the UK, and number 16 on the US Billboard Hot 100. "Controlla" was the second dancehall single to be released from Views, along with "One Dance" and "Too Good".

Pitchfork listed "Controlla" on their ranking of the 100 best songs of 2016 at number 62.

Background
Prior to the album's release, "Controlla" was one of two tracks from Views leaked online; The leaked version featured dancehall artist Popcaan. The song was still included on the album without Popcaan's contributions and an additional Drake verse plus a Beenie Man sample.

Production and composition
"Controlla" was written by Drake, Matthew Samuels, Allen Ritter, Dwayne Chin-Quee, Stephen McGregor, Moses Davis, Donald Dennis, Gary Jackson, Patrick Roberts, Andrew Thomas, and produced by Boi-1da, Supa Dups, and Charles "Jamandass da Terminator" Omondi. In addition to Drake's lead vocals, the track contains samples of "Tear Off Mi Garment" performed by Beenie Man, though sources compared the song to Rihanna's "Work", the same track Drake was featured on.

Track listing

Charts

Weekly charts

Year-end charts

Certifications

References

External links
Lyrics of this song at Genius

2015 songs
2016 singles
Drake (musician) songs
Song recordings produced by Boi-1da
Reggae fusion songs
Songs written by Drake (musician)
Songs written by Boi-1da
Songs written by Allen Ritter
Songs written by Supa Dups